Martina Pretelli (born 28 December 1988, Borgo Maggiore) is an athlete from San Marino who competes in the 100 metres. Pretelli competed for San Marino at the 2012 Summer Olympics in London.

Competition record

References

Sammarinese female sprinters
1988 births
Living people
Olympic athletes of San Marino
Athletes (track and field) at the 2012 Summer Olympics
World Athletics Championships athletes for San Marino
Athletes (track and field) at the 2015 European Games
European Games competitors for San Marino
Olympic female sprinters